The barque Vere was launched in Chester in 1811 as a West Indiaman. She also traded with Africa and Canada. She was last listed in 1842.

Career
Vere first appeared in Lloyd's Register (LR) in 1811.

Vere, Hemmingway, master, arrived at San Fernando do Po on 24 August from Bonny. She sailed from there on 5 September and arrived back at Liverpool around 24 November. Coming into San Fernando do Po she struck several times on the bar and was leaky when she left.

On 27 October 1840 Vere ran aground on Hamilton's Bank, in the Solent. She was on a voyage from Quebec City to Portsmouth, Hampshire. She had to be lightened to be gotten off.

Fate
On 29 March 1843 in a heavy snowstorm, Vere ran aground on Herd Harbour Point, Campbell's Islands, New Brunswick, British North America. She was refloated but consequently had to be beached on Sandy Island, where she was condemned. She was on a voyage from Poole, Dorset to Saint John, New Brunswick.

Citations

Age of Sail merchant ships of England
1811 ships
Ships built in England
Maritime incidents in October 1840